Eugène Dodeigne (27 July 1923 – 24 December 2015) was a French sculptor living and working at Bondues (Nord-Pas-de-Calais).

Life
Dodeigne was born in Rouvreux, near Liège. He learned his trade from his father, a stonecutter, who hired him to take courses in drawing and modeling at Tourcoing and Paris at the École nationale supérieure des Beaux-Arts, where he experienced a revelation in the studio of Marcel Gimond. It was under the influence of the abstract forms of Constantin Brâncuși. He then follows, in 1960, the path of chipped stone that leads to an abrupt figuration, highly expressive, continuing until his most recent sculptures. he also absorbs the counting of Giacometti and Germaine Richier.
When asked to recall his early works and his influences, he remains elusive.

He exhibited at the Jean Brody Galerie, Galerie Claude Bernard, Gallery Pierre Loeb, the Galerie Jeanne Bucher, then in Berlin, Hanover, Rotterdam, Brussels and Pittsburgh provide him, in the 1960s, international recognition which does not disturb his exploration.
In 1968, he devoted himself to a series of sculptures combining new way of smooth surfaces and volumes of irregular stone exploded.

In the 1970s, the Group of Ten (Prouvost Foundation, Marcq-en-Barœul) devoted his evolution towards the monumental, which coincides with the simultaneous development of outdoor sculpture in cities and parks. His sculpture populates many cities and museums of North: Lille, Dunkirk, Villeneuve d'Ascq, Antwerp, Liege, Hanover, Utrecht, then Bobigny, Argentan and Paris, to Grenoble in 1998 and Créteil, more recently.

Sculptures
 1948, Figure debout, bois, Lille Métropole Museum of Modern, Contemporary and Outsider Art, Villeneuve-d'Ascq
 1956, Figure couchée, pierre de Soignies, Lille Métropole Museum of Modern, Contemporary and Outsider Art, Villeneuve-d'Ascq
 1970, Groupe de dix figures, pierre de Soignies, Septentrion, Fondation Albert et Anne Prouvost, Marcq-en-Barœul
 1974, Groupe des cinq, marbre de Carrara (Italie), Palais des Beaux-Arts de Lille
 1976–1979, Groupe des trois, pierre de Soignies, fontaine de la Place de la République, Lille
 1979, Les Pleureuses, pierre de Soignies, jardin des sculptures du  (LAAC), Dunkerque
 Mémorial Charles de Gaulle, jardin Vauban, Lille
 Couple, Museum of Grenoble

Gallery

References

External links

"Eugene Dodeigne", Artnet

1923 births
20th-century French sculptors
French male sculptors
2015 deaths
Members of the Académie des beaux-arts
21st-century French sculptors
21st-century French male artists
People from Liège Province
École des Beaux-Arts alumni